Saint Vincent and the Grenadines competed at the 2017 World Aquatics Championships in Budapest, Hungary from 14 July to 30 July.

Swimming

Saint Vincent and the Grenadines has received a Universality invitation from FINA to send two male swimmers to the World Championships.

References

Nations at the 2017 World Aquatics Championships
Saint Vincent and the Grenadines at the World Aquatics Championships
2017 in Saint Vincent and the Grenadines